Olga Tsarbopoulou (born 19 June 1968) is a former professional tennis player from Greece.

Biography
Tsarbopoulou was 15, when she began competing for the Greece Fed Cup team in 1983.

She was a bronze medalist in the singles event at the 1983 Mediterranean Games in Casablanca and partnered with Angeliki Kanellopoulou to win a women's doubles gold medal when Syria hosted the 1987 Mediterranean Games. 

On the WTA Tour, she had her best performances in 1987, when she was a quarterfinalist in Athens and made the round of 16 in Buenos Aires. She reached her career best ranking of 117 in the world in 1988, with main-draw appearances that year at the Australian Open and US Open. 

She was a member of the Greece contingent at the 1988 Summer Olympics, appearing in the singles draw, where she lost in the first round to Argentina's Mercedes Paz.

Retiring in 1991, she finished her Fed Cup career having appeared in 18 ties.

ITF finals

Singles: 4 (2–2)

Doubles: 1 (0–1)

References

External links
 
 
 

1968 births
Living people
Greek female tennis players
Mediterranean Games gold medalists for Greece
Mediterranean Games bronze medalists for Greece
Olympic tennis players of Greece
Tennis players at the 1988 Summer Olympics
Mediterranean Games medalists in tennis
Competitors at the 1983 Mediterranean Games
Competitors at the 1987 Mediterranean Games
Sportspeople from Athens